The 2nd constituency of Territoire-de-Belfort is a French legislative constituency in the Territoire-de-Belfort département.

Description

The 2nd constituency of Territoire-de-Belfort includes most of Belfort itself as well as the territory in the north west of the department.

The constituency is notable for being the home seat of former Interior Minister Jean-Pierre Chevènement, who left the Socialist Party to found the Citizens' Movement in 1993.

Historic Representation

Election results

2022

 
 
|-
| colspan="8" bgcolor="#E9E9E9"|
|-
 
 

 
 
 
 
 * Vallverdu ran as a dissident LR candidate, without the support of the party or the UDC alliance.

2017

 
 
 
 
 
 
 
|-
| colspan="8" bgcolor="#E9E9E9"|
|-

2012

 
 
 
 
 
 
 
 
|-
| colspan="8" bgcolor="#E9E9E9"|
|-

2007

 
 
 
 
 
 
 
|-
| colspan="8" bgcolor="#E9E9E9"|
|-

2002

 
 
 
 
 
 
 
|-
| colspan="8" bgcolor="#E9E9E9"|
|-

1997

Sources
Official results of French elections from 2002: "Résultats électoraux officiels en France" (in French).

2